The Victoria Grizzlies are a junior "A" ice hockey team based in Victoria, British Columbia. They are members of the Island Division of the British Columbia Hockey League (BCHL). They play their home games at The Q Centre. The franchise was founded in 1994 as the Victoria Salsa.

History
The Victoria Cougars were created as a Junior A team, playing out of Victoria, British Columbia, which joined the British Columbia Junior Hockey League (BCJHL) as an expansion team for the start of the 1967–68 season. This brought the league to a total of six teams. After a 1971 realignment of junior hockey into "Major Junior" and "Tier II Junior A", the Cougars joined the Western Canadian Hockey League (WCHL), now the Western Hockey League.  In 1994 the Cougars relocated to Prince George, British Columbia.

In 1990, the BCHL's Cowichan Valley Capitals relocated to Victoria from Duncan, British Columbia and became the Victoria Warriors. The Warriors returned to Duncan in 1993 and became the Cowichan Valley Capitals again, so in 1994 the Victoria Salsa joined the BCHL as an expansion team.

At the start of the 2006–07 season, the team was renamed as the Victoria Grizzlies.  The Grizzlies hosted and played in the 2009 Royal Bank Cup, won by the Vernon Vipers. In the 2013–14 season they won the Island Division championship after beating Powell River 4–2 in game six.

Season-by-season record

Note: GP = Games Played, W = Wins, L = Losses, T = Ties, OTL = Overtime Losses, GF = Goals for, GA = Goals against

NHL alumni

Awards and trophies

Fred Page Cup
 2001

Mowat Cup
 2001

Cliff McNabb Memorial Trophy
 2001

Chevrolet Cup
 2009

Brett Hull Trophy
Matthew Wood: 2022
Tyler Bozak: 2007
Kyle Greentree: 2004

Joe Tennant Memorial Trophy
 Campbell Blair: 2000

Bob Fenton Trophy
Gary Nunn: 2007
Terry Wilson: 1999

Top Defenceman Trophy
Jordan Heywood: 2010

Vern Dye Trophy
Jordan Sigalet: 2001
Jimi St. John: 1998

Bruce Allison Memorial Trophy
Jamie Benn: 2007

See also
List of ice hockey teams in British Columbia

References

External links
 Official website of the Victoria Grizzlies
 Official website of the BCHL

Ice hockey teams in British Columbia
British Columbia Hockey League teams
Grizzlies